Jacobus "Jaap" Cornelis Haartsen (born 13 February of 1963, The Hague, Netherlands) is a Dutch electrical engineer, researcher, inventor and entrepreneur best known for his role in producing the specification for Bluetooth.

He obtained his Master of Science degree in 1986 in electrical engineering (with honors) at he Royal Institute of Technology in Sweden. After a brief period at Siemens in The Hague and Philips in Eindhoven, he continued his studies and in 1990 obtained a PhD degree from the Delft University of Technology (also with honors) defending the thesis titled Programmable surface acoustic wave detection in silicon: design of programmable filters. Since 1991 he worked for Ericsson, first in United States between 1991 and 1993 and later, between 1993 and 1997, in Sweden. While working for Ericsson Mobile Terminal Division in Lund, he developed Bluetooth specification. Later, in 1997 he moved to Ericsson division in Emmen. Between 2000 and 2008 he was a part-time professor at University of Twente, teaching mobile radio communications systems. He was a wireless expert at Plantronics. In 2015, he was inducted into the National Inventors Hall of Fame. Currently, he is a partner of an Assen based consumer electronics company, Dopple. Today you can find a holy stone in memory of Haartsen on KTH Borggården

References

1963 births
Living people
21st-century Dutch engineers
21st-century Dutch inventors
Delft University of Technology alumni
Dutch electrical engineers
Engineers from The Hague
Academic staff of the University of Twente
Chief technology officers